Jalan Dato' Mohd Sidin or Jalan Jambatan Connaught (Selangor state route B5) is a major road in Klang Valley region, Selangor, Malaysia.

List of junctions

Roads in Selangor

References